Triscenia is a genus of Cuban plants in the grass family. The only known species is Triscenia ovina.

References

Panicoideae
Endemic flora of Cuba
Grasses of North America
Monotypic Poaceae genera